Arabicus may refer to:

Arabicus, a Roman imperial victory title
Bufo arabicus, synonym for Sclerophrys arabica, the Arabian toad